Lotfy may refer to:

Mohammed Lotfy Gomaa (1886–1953), Egyptian patriot, essayist, author, and barrister
Lotfy Mustafa Kamal (born 1952), Egyptian Minister of Civil Aviation, Egyptian Air Force commander
Lotfy Labib (born 1938), Egyptian stage, television and film actor
Ayman Lotfy (born 1968), Egyptian fine art photographer
Giana Lotfy or Giana Farouk (born 1994), Egyptian karateka
Hala Lotfy (born 1973), Egyptian film director and producer
Karim Samir Lotfy (born 1989), Egyptian high jumper
Mohamed Lotfy (human rights defender), co-founder & executive director of the Egyptian Commission for Rights and Freedoms
Nabiha Lotfy (1937–2015), Lebanese-born actor and film director
Aly Lotfy Mahmoud (1935–2018), Prime Minister of Egypt (1985–1986)
Mohammed Lotfy Shabana (born 1931), senior commander in the Egyptian Air Force
Lotfy El Tanbouli (1919–1982), painter and Egyptologist